Bailén is a metro station of the Metrovalencia network in Valencia, Spain. It is situated on Carrer de Bailén, in the southern part of the city centre. The station is an underground structure.

Metrovalencia stations